The February 14 Group is a political alliance in Burkina Faso (former Upper Volta. 
It was founded in February 1997 and consists of the following parties.

Front of Social Forces (FFS)
Patriotic Front for Change (FPC)
Group of Patriotic Democrats (GDP)
African Independence Party (PAI)
Party for Democracy and Progress / Socialist Party (PDP/PS)
Party of the Independent Forces for Development (PFID)
Republican National Party / Just Way (PNR/JV)
Union for Rebirth / Sankarist Movement (UNIR/MS)
Party for Democracy and Socialism (PDS)
Left-wing political party alliances
Political party alliances in Burkina Faso